Baeckea frutescens is a species of flowering plant in the family Myrtaceae and is native to eastern Southeast Asia, New Guinea and Australia. It is a shrub with arching branches, linear leaves and white flowers with seven to thirteen stamens.

Description

Taxonomy
Baeckea frutescens was first formally described in 1753 by Carl Linnaeus in Species Plantarum. The specific epithet (frutescens) means "becoming bushy or shrubby".

Distribution and habitat
This baeckea grows in heath and open grassland from south-east China to eastern Australia. In Australia it grows in near-coastal areas as far south as Port Macquarie.

References

Flora of New South Wales
Flora of Queensland
frutescens
Plants described in 1753
Taxa named by Carl Linnaeus